Darwin Phelps (April 17, 1807 – December 14, 1879) was a Republican member of the U.S. House of Representatives from Pennsylvania.

Biography
Darwin Phelps was born in East Granby, Connecticut.  He was left an orphan at an early age and went to live with his grandparents in Portage, Ohio, where he completed preparatory studies.  He attended Western University in Pittsburgh, Pennsylvania.

He studied law in Pittsburgh, was admitted to the bar and commenced practice in Kittanning, Pennsylvania, in 1835.  He was a member of the board of trustees of Kittanning Academy, a member of the town council in 1841 and 1848, and burgess in 1844, 1845, 1849, 1852, 1855, 1858, 1859, and 1861.  He was an unsuccessful Republican candidate for auditor general in 1856.  He was a delegate to the 1860 Republican National Convention.

Phelps served as major of the Twenty-second Regiment, Pennsylvania Volunteer Militia, in 1862.  He was member of the Pennsylvania State House of Representatives in 1865.

Phelps was elected as a Republican to the Forty-first Congress.  He was not a candidate for renomination in 1870.  He died in Kittanning in 1879.  Interment in Kittanning Cemetery.

References
 Retrieved on 2008-02-14
The Political Graveyard

Republican Party members of the Pennsylvania House of Representatives
Union Army officers
Pennsylvania lawyers
People from Armstrong County, Pennsylvania
1807 births
1879 deaths
Republican Party members of the United States House of Representatives from Pennsylvania
19th-century American politicians
People from Portage, Ohio
People from Hartford County, Connecticut
19th-century American lawyers
Military personnel from Pennsylvania